Jennifer Hetrick (born May 12, 1958) is an American actress. She is known for playing Vash in Star Trek: The Next Generation and Star Trek: Deep Space Nine, and Corrinne Becker (the ex-wife of Arnie Becker) on L.A. Law.

Prior to her Star Trek: The Next Generation appearances, she had appeared in a series of Oil of Olay commercials.

Filmography

Film

Television

References

External links
 

1958 births
Actresses from Ohio
American film actresses
American television actresses
Living people
People from Westerville, Ohio
21st-century American women